Škoflje refers to the following places in Slovenia:

 Škoflje, Divača
 Škoflje, Ivančna Gorica